The Nigeria Prize for Science  is a Nigerian science award given annually since 2004 for excellence in science breakthroughs. It is the country's highest scientific award. The award is sponsored by Nigeria Liquefied Natural Gas company. The prize describes itself as "bringing Nigerian scientists to public attention and celebrating excellence in scientific breakthroughs".

History
The Prize was initially $20,000 each in Literature and Science.This was increased to $30,000 in 2006, and again to $50,000 in 2008. In 2011 the prize was increased to $100,000.

Past recipients
Source: Nigeria NLG Ltd

See also

 Nigeria Prize for Literature –sister award for Literature
 List of general science and technology awards

References

External links
The Nigeria Prize for Science, official website.

 Awards established in 2004
Research awards
Scientific research awards
Nigerian science and technology awards
2004 establishments in Nigeria